Joseph Hopkins Peyton (May 20, 1808 – November 11, 1845) was an American politician who represented Tennessee's eighth district in the United States House of Representatives.

Biography
Born on May 20, 1808 in Gallatin, Tennessee, Peyton accomplished preparatory studies and graduated from college in 1837. He studied and practiced medicine. He was the brother of Balie Peyton. He married Mary Elizabeth Hatton in 1841. They had two children before she died in November 1812.

Career
Peyton held various local offices and was elected as a member of the Tennessee Senate in 1840. He was elected as a Whig to the Twenty-eighth and Twenty-ninth Congresses. He served from March 4, 1843 until his death on November 11, 1845.

Death
Peyton died on November 11, 1845, near Gallatin, Tennessee and is interred at the family burying ground near Gallatin.

See also
List of United States Congress members who died in office (1790–1899)

References

External links

1808 births
1845 deaths
Tennessee state senators
Whig Party members of the United States House of Representatives from Tennessee
19th-century American politicians